Sleme (in older sources also Gorenje Sleme) is a small settlement northwest of Velike Bloke in the Municipality of Bloke in the Inner Carniola region of Slovenia.

References

External links

Sleme on Geopedia

Populated places in the Municipality of Bloke